Fish River, a perennial stream that is part of the Macquarie catchment within the Murray–Darling basin, is located in the central western district of New South Wales, Australia. The Fish River is in Wiradjuri country and its indigenous name is Wambuul, which means “winding river”.

The Fish River rises on the plateau south east of Oberon, and flows generally to the north-west, becoming the main headwater of the Macquarie River. It merges with Campbells River, just east of Bathurst, forming the Macquarie River.  The river is impounded by a reservoir near Oberon which supplies water for the region. The Fish River descends  over its  course.

The Fish River was given its name by George Evans in 1813, because of the large number of fish they found in it,  being a rare permanent stream.

See also 

 Rivers of New South Wales

References

External links
 

Rivers of New South Wales
Murray-Darling basin